The Moonstone (1868) by Wilkie Collins is a 19th-century British epistolary novel. It is an early example of the modern detective novel, and established many of the ground rules of the modern genre. The story was serialised in Charles Dickens’s magazine All the Year Round. Collins adapted The Moonstone for the stage in 1877.

Etymology
The Moonstone of the title is a diamond (not to be confused with the semi-precious moonstone gem). It has gained its name from its association with the Hindu god of the Moon, Chandra. It is protected by three hereditary guardians on the orders of Vishnu, and waxes and wanes in brilliance along with the light of the Moon.

Plot outline
Rachel Verinder, a young English woman, inherits a large Indian diamond on her eighteenth birthday. It is a legacy from her uncle, a corrupt British army officer who served in India. The diamond is of great religious significance and extremely valuable, and three Hindu priests have dedicated their lives to recovering it. The story incorporates elements of the legendary origins of the Hope Diamond (or perhaps the Orloff Diamond or the Koh-i-Noor diamond). Rachel's eighteenth birthday is celebrated with a large party at which the guests include her cousin Franklin Blake. She wears the Moonstone on her dress that evening for all to see, including some Indian jugglers who have called at the house. Later that night the diamond is stolen from Rachel's bedroom, and a period of turmoil, unhappiness, misunderstandings and ill luck ensues. Told by a series of narratives from some of the main characters, the complex plot traces the subsequent efforts to explain the theft, identify the thief, trace the stone and recover it.

Plot summary
Colonel Herncastle, an unpleasant former soldier, brings the Moonstone back with him from India where he acquired it by theft and murder during the Siege of Seringapatam. Angry at his family, who shun him, he leaves it in his will as a birthday gift to his niece Rachel, thus exposing her to attack by the stone's hereditary guardians, who will stop at nothing to retrieve it.

Rachel wears the stone to her birthday party, but that night it disappears from her room. Suspicion falls on three Indian jugglers who have been near the house; on Rosanna Spearman, a maidservant who begins to act oddly and who then drowns herself in a local quicksand; and on Rachel herself, who also behaves suspiciously and is suddenly furious with Franklin Blake, with whom she has previously appeared to be enamoured, when he directs attempts to find it. Despite the efforts of Sergeant Cuff, a renowned detective, the house party ends with the mystery unsolved, and the protagonists disperse.

During the ensuing year there are hints that the diamond was removed from the house and may be in a London bank vault, having been pledged as surety to a moneylender. The Indian jugglers are still nearby, watching and waiting. Rachel's grief and isolation increase, especially after her mother dies, and she first accepts and then rejects a marriage proposal from her cousin Godfrey Ablewhite, a philanthropist who was also present at the birthday dinner and whose father owns the bank near Rachel's old family home. Finally Franklin Blake returns from travelling abroad and determines to solve the mystery. He first discovers that Rosanna Spearman's behaviour was due to her having fallen in love with him.
She found evidence (a paint smear on his nightclothes) that convinced her that he was the thief and concealed it to save him, confusing the trail of evidence and throwing suspicion on herself. In despair at her inability to make him acknowledge her despite all she had done for him, she killed herself, leaving behind the smeared gown and a letter he did not receive at the time because of his hasty departure abroad.

Now believing that Rachel suspects him of the theft on Rosanna's evidence, Franklin engineers a meeting and asks her. To his astonishment she tells him she actually saw him steal the diamond and has been protecting his reputation at the cost of her own even though she believes him to be a thief and a hypocrite. With hope of redeeming himself he returns to Yorkshire to the scene of the crime and is befriended by Mr. Candy's assistant, Mr. Ezra Jennings. They join together to continue the investigations and learn that Franklin was secretly given laudanum during the night of the party (by the doctor, Mr. Candy, who wanted to exact vengeance on Franklin for criticising medicine); it appears that this, in addition to his anxiety about Rachel and the diamond and other nervous irritations, caused him to take the diamond in a narcotic trance, to move it to a safe place. A re-enactment of the evening's events confirms this, but how the stone ended up in a London bank remains a mystery solved only a year after the birthday party when the stone is redeemed. Franklin and his allies trace the claimant to a seedy waterside inn, only to discover that the Indians have got there first: the claimant is dead and the stone is gone. Under the dead man's disguise is none other than Godfrey Ablewhite, who is found to have embezzled the contents of a trust fund in his care and to have been facing exposure soon after the birthday party. The mystery of what Blake did while in his drugged state is solved: he encountered Ablewhite in the passageway outside Rachel's room and gave the Moonstone to him to be put back in his father's bank, from which it had been withdrawn on the morning of the party to be given to Rachel. Seeing his salvation, Ablewhite pocketed the stone instead, and pledged it as surety for a loan to save himself temporarily from insolvency. When he was murdered, he was on his way to Amsterdam to have the stone cut; it would then have been sold to replenish the plundered trust fund before the beneficiary inherited.

The mystery is solved, Rachel and Franklin marry, and in an epilogue from Mr. Murthwaite, a noted adventurer, the reader learns of the restoration of the Moonstone to the place where it should be, in the forehead of the statue of the god in India.

Characters
 Rachel Verinder – 
 Lady Verinder – her mother, a wealthy widow, devoted to her daughter
 Colonel Herncastle – Lady Verinder's brother, suspected of foul deeds in India; gained the Moonstone by unlawful means (namely murder and theft)
 Gabriel Betteredge – a venerable man, the Verinders' head servant, first narrator
 Penelope Betteredge – his daughter, also a servant in the household
 Rosanna Spearman – second housemaid, once in a penitentiary for theft, suspected of the theft of the diamond
 Drusilla Clack – a poor cousin of Rachel Verinder, an unpleasant, hypocritical meddler, second narrator
 Franklin Blake – an adventurer, also cousin and suitor of Rachel
 Godfrey Ablewhite – a philanthropist, another cousin, and suitor, of Rachel
 Mr Bruff – a family solicitor, third narrator
 Sergeant Cuff – a famous detective with a penchant for roses
 Dr Candy – the family physician, loses the ability to speak coherently after recovering from a fever
 Ezra Jennings – Dr Candy's unpopular and odd-looking assistant, suffers from an incurable illness and uses opium to control the pain, fourth narrator
 Mr Murthwaite – a noted adventurer who has travelled frequently in India; he provides the epilogue to the story
 The Indian jugglers – three disguised Hindu Brahmins who are determined to recover the diamond.

Literary significance
The book is regarded by some as the precursor of the modern mystery novel and the suspense novel. T. S. Eliot called it "the first, the longest, and the best of modern English detective novels in a genre invented by Collins and not by Poe," and Dorothy L. Sayers praised it as "probably the very finest detective story ever written". In The Victorian Age in Literature G. K. Chesterton calls it "probably the best detective tale in the world". It was published in 1868, later than Poe's short story mysteries "The Murders in the Rue Morgue" (1841) (which introduced the famous locked-room paradigm), "The Mystery of Marie Rogêt" (1842) and "The Purloined Letter" (1845). The plot also shows some parallels with The Hermitage (1839), an earlier murder mystery story by the English novelist Sarah Burney: for example, the return of a childhood companion, the sexual symbolism of defloration implied in the crime, and the almost catatonic reactions of the heroine to it. However, The Moonstone introduced a number of the elements that became classic attributes of the twentieth-century detective story in novel form, as opposed to Poe's short story form. These include:

 an English country house robbery
 an "inside job"
 red herrings
 a celebrated, skilled, professional investigator
 a bungling local constabulary
 detective enquiries
 a large number of false suspects
 the "least likely suspect"
 a reconstruction of the crime
 a final twist in the plot.

Franklin Blake, the gifted amateur, is an early example of the gentleman detective. The highly competent Sergeant Cuff, the policeman called in from Scotland Yard (whom Collins based on the real-life Inspector Jonathan Whicher who solved the murder committed by Constance Kent), is not a member of the gentry and is unable to break Rachel Verinder's reticence about what Cuff knows is an inside job. The Moonstone has also been described as perhaps the earliest police procedural, due to the portrayal of Cuff. The social difference between Collins's two detectives is shown by their relationships with the Verinder family: Sergeant Cuff befriends Gabriel Betteredge, Lady Verinder's steward (chief servant), whereas Franklin Blake eventually marries her daughter Rachel.

A number of critics have suggested that Charles Felix (pseudonym for Charles Warren Adams), in his Notting Hill Mystery (1862–1863), first used techniques that came to define the genre.

The Moonstone represents Collins's only complete reprisal of the popular "multi-narration" method that he had previously used to great effect in The Woman in White. The sections by Gabriel Betteredge (steward to the Verinder household) and Miss Clack (a poor relative and religious crank) offer both humour and pathos through their contrast with the testimony of other narrators, at the same time constructing and advancing the novel's plot.

One of the features that made The Moonstone a success was the sensationalist depiction of opium addiction. Unbeknownst to his readers, Collins was writing from personal experience. In his later years Collins grew severely addicted to laudanum and as a result suffered from paranoid delusions, the most notable being his conviction that he was constantly accompanied by a doppelgänger whom he dubbed "Ghost Wilkie".

The novel was Collins's last great success, coming at the end of an extraordinarily productive period in which four successive novels became bestsellers. After The Moonstone Collins wrote novels containing more overt social commentary that did not achieve the same audience.

A heavily fictionalised account of Collins's life while writing The Moonstone forms much of the plot of Dan Simmons's novel Drood (2009).

Adaptations
In 1934, the book was first made into a film, The Moonstone by Monogram Pictures Corporation. Adapted to the screen by Adele S. Buffington, it was directed by Reginald Barker, and starred David Manners, Charles Irwin  and Phyllis Barry.

On 11 March 1945 "The Moonstone" was episode number 67 of the U.S. radio series The Weird Circle. 

In 1946, Classic Comics, the predecessor of Classics Illustrated, published in comic book format the novel in issue #30, with cover and artwork by Don Rico. The adaptation was re-published in 1960 with cover and artwork by L.B. Cole.

On 15 April 1947, an adaptation of "The Moonstone" was episode #47 of the NBC radio series Favorite Story hosted by Ronald Colman. On 16 November and 23 November 1953, "The Moonstone", starring Peter Lawford, was broadcast as a two-part episode of the U.S. radio drama "Suspense".

In 1959, the BBC adapted the novel as a television serial starring James Hayter. In 1972 the serial was remade, featuring Robin Ellis. This second version was aired in the United States on PBS's  Masterpiece Theatre.

In 1974, a German version, was produced by Westdeutscher Rundfunk for television.

In November 1977, Marvel Comics released a comic-book adaptation of the book in issue #23 of the "Marvel Classics Comics" series.

In 1996 The Moonstone was made for television by the BBC and Carlton Television in partnership with WGBH of Boston, Massachusetts, airing again on Masterpiece Theatre. It starred Greg Wise as Franklin Blake and Keeley Hawes as Rachel Verinder.

In 2011, BBC Radio 4 serialised the story in four hour-long episodes in the Classic Serial slot with Eleanor Bron as Lady Verinder, Paul Rhys as Franklin Blake, Jasmine Hyde as Rachel Verinder and Kenneth Cranham as Sergeant Cuff.

In 2016, the BBC adapted the novel for a five-part afternoon TV series The Moonstone starting 31 October 2016.

In December 2018, Screen14 Pictures, a team that produces fictional stories' adaption for the web, created a serialised web series of the novel on YouTube, Twitter, and Instagram.

In April 2020, the novel was read in serialized fashion by Phoebe Judge of Criminal on her Phoebe Reads a Mystery podcast.

References

External links

 
 The Moonstone on Open Library
 
 

1868 British novels
1868 fantasy novels
British mystery novels
British novels adapted into films
British novels adapted into plays
British novels adapted into television shows
Epistolary novels
Fiction with unreliable narrators
Locked-room mysteries
Novels by Wilkie Collins
Novels first published in serial form
Victorian novels
Works originally published in All the Year Round